The 1997 MFS Pro Tennis Championships, also known as the U.S. Pro Tennis Championships was a men's tennis tournament played on outdoor hard courts at the Longwood Cricket Club in Boston, Massachusetts, United States. The event was part of the World Series  of the 1997 ATP Tour. It was the 69th edition of the tournament and was held from August 18 through August 24, 1997. Unseeded Sjeng Schalken won the singles title.

Finals

Singles

 Sjeng Schalken defeated  Marcelo Ríos 7–5, 6–3
 It was Schalken's 1st singles title of the year and the 3rd of his career.

Doubles

 Jacco Eltingh /  Paul Haarhuis defeated  Dave Randall /  Jack Waite 6–4, 6–2

References

External links
 ITF tournament edition details
 Longwood Cricket Club – list of U.S. Pro Champions

1997
MFS Pro Tennis Championships
MFS Pro Tennis Championships
MFS Pro Tennis Championships
MFS Pro Tennis Championships
Tennis tournaments in Massachusetts
Sports competitions in Boston